Anthony Cavanough is a Trials Division justice at the Supreme Court of Victoria. He is a graduate of the law program at Monash University and was called to the bar in 1979. He was appointed to the bench in 2009.

References

Judges of the Supreme Court of Victoria
Monash University alumni
Living people
Year of birth missing (living people)
Monash Law School alumni